Stella was an American guitar brand owned by the Oscar Schmidt Company. It was founded around 1899. The Stella brand consists of low and mid-level stringed instruments.

Stella guitars were played by notable artists, including Robert Johnson, Lead Belly, Charlie Patton, Doc Watson and Willie Nelson who learned to play on one. Kurt Cobain of Nirvana played an acoustic Stella on the recording of the song Polly, from the Nevermind album, and Mason Williams with Classical Gas.

Stella was acquired by the Harmony Company in 1939. The brand was dissolved in 1974, and was later reintroduced by M.B.T. International, which is the corporate parent of the Harmony Company.

History 

Stella was one of several musical instrument brands made in Jersey City, New Jersey, by the Oscar Schmidt Company. Other Schmidt brands included "Sovereign" and "La Scala".  The company produced low and mid-level stringed instruments such as guitars, mandolins, banjos and autoharps.

The company thrived during the first quarter of the 20th century. In 1920, the company was said to be the world's largest manufacturer of stringed instruments. Stella instruments were noted for their good tone and relatively low price. Top-of-the-line Stella and Sovereign guitars cost a fraction of the lowest-end Gibson or C. F. Martin instruments.

After struggling through the Great Depression, the company sold their fretted instrument division in the late 1930s, but continued to make autoharps. Schmidt's Stella, Sovereign and La Scala brands were acquired by the Harmony Company of Chicago, Illinois in 1939. Harmony went on to produce student-grade Stella instruments, as well as mid-level Sovereign guitars and banjos.

Notable users 

 Leo Kottke
 Lead Belly
 R.L. Burnside
 Kurt Cobain
 Ben Gibbard
 Michael Hurley
 Skip James
 Robert Johnson
 Justin Vernon
 Blind Willie McTell
 Charlie Patton
 Elvis Presley
 Doc Watson
 Leon Bridges
 Jesse Edwin Davis
 Mason Williams
 Neal Schon
 Willie Nelson
 Son House
 Willie Brown
 Maybelle Carter
B.B. King
 Kerry Livgren
 Howlin Wolf
 Mississippi John Hurt
 Hobo Jim
 Muddy Waters

See also 
 Oscar Schmidt Inc.
 Harmony Company

References

External links
 Tribute website

Guitars
Musical instruments brands